Sophocles is a Greek masculine given name. 

Sophocles or Sofoklis may refer to:

Sophocles
 Sophocles (c. 497/6–406/5 BC), ancient Greek playwright
 Sophocles Papas (1893 or 1894–1986), Greek classical guitar pedagogue and music publisher
 Sophocles Sophocleous (born 1962), Cypriot politician
 Sophocles Sophocleous (academic), Cypriot academic

Sofoklis
 Sofoklis Avraam Choudaverdoglou-Theodotos (1872–1956), Greek scholar, historian, stenographer and member of the Ottoman Parliament
 Sofoklis Dousmanis (1868–1952), Greek admiral, twice chief of the Greek Navy General Staff, and Minister for Naval Affairs
 Sofokli Lazri (1923–2002), Albanian diplomat, journalist and suspected KGB agent
 Sofoklis Schortsanitis (born 1985), Greek former basketball player
 Sofoklis Venizelos (1894–1964), Greek politician, three times Prime Minister of Greece

Greek masculine given names